Broken Crown Halo is the seventh studio album by Italian gothic metal band Lacuna Coil. It was released through Century Media Records on March 31, 2014 in Europe, Australia and New Zealand, and on April 1 in North America. This is the last album to feature drummer Cristiano "Criz" Mozzati and guitarists Marco "Maus" Biazzi and Cristiano "Pizza" Migliore, who retired from the band in 2014, marking the end of the band's longest-standing line-up.

Promotion 
On February 8, 2014, a second track from the album titled "Die & Rise" was added to the Amazon store. The song was released as a digital download on Amazon.com on February 18, 2014.

Tour
On January 13, 2014, it was announced that Lacuna Coil will be doing a part of the second The Hottest Chicks In Hard Rock Tour with Sick Puppies, Eyes Set To Kill and Cilver, making it a twenty one-date tour around the United States.

Singles
"Nothing Stands In Our Way" served as the lead single from Broken Crown Halo on February 7, 2014. The official video for the song was leaked on Vimeo on August 18, 2014.

On February 10, with the announcement that "I Forgive (But I Won’t Forget Your Name)" had been released in UK and Italian radio, it was also stated that, an official music video, was filmed the same day.

Commercial performance
In the United States, the album debuted at number 27 on the Billboard 200 with 13,000 copies sold in its first week.

Composition 
The Album "Broken Crown Halo" was written by Lacuna Coil, produced by Jay Baumgardner, engineered by Kyle Hoffmann and was mastered by Howie Weinberg. The album was described by the band like a cinematic album, about a dark vision of a near future.

The album was also influenced by classic Italian horror movies and bands like Goblin, the composer of Dario Argento's classics like Suspiria and Deep Red.

Track listing

Personnel
Lacuna Coil
 Andrea Ferro - male vocals
 Cristina Scabbia - female vocals
 Marco "Maus" Biazzi - lead guitar
 Cristiano "Pizza" Migliore - rhythm guitar
 Marco Coti Zelati - bass, keyboards
 Cristiano "CriZ" Mozzati: drums, percussion

Additional personnel
Jay Baumgardner - production

Charts

Release history

References

Lacuna Coil albums
Century Media Records albums
2014 albums